is a railway station in the city of Kosai, Shizuoka Prefecture, Japan, operated by the third sector Tenryū Hamanako Railroad. It is located in front of the headquarters and factory of ASMO Co. Ltd., an automobile components manufacturer and subsidiary of Denso.

Lines
Asumomae Station is served by the Tenryū Hamanako Line, and is located 66.7 kilometers from the starting point of the line at Kakegawa Station.

Station layout
The station has one side platform serving a single bi-directional track. The station is unattended.

Adjacent stations

|-
!colspan=5|Tenryū Hamanako Railroad

Station history
Asumomae Station was established on March 15, 1988, as part of the expansion of services on the Tenryū Hamanako Line after the privatization of JNR in 1987.

Passenger statistics
In fiscal 2016, the station was used by an average of 21 passengers daily (boarding passengers only).

Surrounding area
 Denso - Kosai factory

See also
 List of Railway Stations in Japan

External links

  Tenryū Hamanako Railroad Station information 
 

Railway stations in Shizuoka Prefecture
Railway stations in Japan opened in 1988
Stations of Tenryū Hamanako Railroad
Kosai, Shizuoka